Marte Samson (born July 22, 1951) is a former Filipino basketball player. He played college ball for the Ateneo de Manila University, where he won a championship in 1969, before moving on to play basketball for the Elizalde & Co. team of the Manila Industrial and Commercial Athletic Association. Samson also appeared at the Olympic Games as a member of the country's national basketball team.

References

External links

1951 births
Living people
Olympic basketball players of the Philippines
Ateneo Blue Eagles men's basketball players
Basketball players at the 1972 Summer Olympics
Philippines men's national basketball team players
Filipino men's basketball players
San Miguel Beermen players